Warwick High School is a high school in Newport News, Virginia, United States.  Warwick is the oldest of five high schools in the city and has been home to the Newport News Centre for the International Baccalaureate (IB) program since 1995.  The school's sports teams are nicknamed the Raiders. On average, The student population is around 1,600

History

The school originally opened in 1926 as Morrison High School in the small community of Morrison. It became Warwick High School in 1948. Originally located in Warwick County, it became part of the Newport News Public Schools system in 1958 when the citizenry of the former Warwick County voted to be politically consolidated with the neighboring independent city of Newport News. The facilities at Warwick High School were expanded to their current size in 1968.

Following the 1954 Brown vs. Board of Education decision of the U.S. Supreme Court, racial desegregation lawsuits eventually resulted in a federal court-ordered busing program in Newport News, which began in 1971. Busing changed the nature of Warwick's population and community. However, in the years after the federal court supervision ended, a magnet school approach was adopted to attract students and families to select the school voluntarily.

Due to overcrowding and pest-control issues, Warwick High School expanded into the building, formerly the Warwick Early Childhood Center. This building is now known as the Senior Center, although students from all grades may have classes there. However, this building was under construction and estimated to be finished at the start of the 2023-2024 school year.

Extracurricular activities
During the 2007–2008 school year, Warwick High School started an archery team. The team won the state competition and went to nationals in Louisville, Kentucky. 

Warwick High School's Scholastic Bowl team has won the Peninsula District Scholastic Bowl every year since 2017-18.

Warwick High School has also enjoyed great success in debate and forensics. Students from the debate team qualified for the state championship tournament in the 2021-2022 year and won the LD style championship.

In 1986, the Raiders football team advanced to the state championship but lost to Thomas Edison 7-6. In 2022-2023 School year, The Raiders football team went to states. In the finals, however, the Raiders lost 28-0.

Demographics

On average for the 10 year span of 2012 to 2022:

Notable alumni
 Will Crutchfield – orchestra conductor
 Tim Fasano – Bigfoot hunter, blogger, author – Class of 1975
 Johnny Gilbert - game show announcer, Jeopardy!
 Gary Hudson – actor - class of 1974
 Henry Jordan – former National Football League player, 5-time NFL champion, member of Pro Football Hall of Fame
 Norman Snead – former National Football League player, quarterback, second overall pick of 1961 NFL Draft
 Sonja Sohn (Williams) – actress in the HBO drama The Wire
 William Styron - novelist and essayist, attended two years before transferring to Christchurch School, where he graduated
 Marcus Vick – National Football League player - Class of 2002 
 Michael Vick – National Football League player - Class of 1998
 B. W. Webb - National Football League cornerback for the New York Giants

References

High schools in Newport News, Virginia
Public high schools in Virginia